Swansea High School in Swansea, South Carolina is a public high school offering education for grades 9–12, serving the surrounding communities of Swansea, Gaston, and parts of Pelion. It derives its name from its location next to Swansea, South Carolina.

Feeder schools
The following elementary and middle schools feed into Swansea High School:
Early Childhood Center (opened in 2011) (3K–5K) 
Sandhills Primary (1st–2nd grade)
Sandhills Elementary (3rd–4th grade)
Sandhills Middle (7th–8th Grade)
Swansea High Freshmen Academy (9th graders only)

Athletics
Swansea's teams are known as the Tigers. Their main athletic rival is the Pelion High School Panthers.

State championships 
 Basketball - Girls: 1995
 Football: 1960, 1974, 1975, 1992, 1993, 1994
 Wrestling: 1979, 1980, 1981, 1986, 1987, 1990, 1991, 1992, 1995, 2002

Notable Alumni
Victor Riley, former NFL offensive lineman

References

External links
High School Info
Swansea High School Official Site

Public high schools in South Carolina
Schools in Lexington County, South Carolina